Tardi Beg, born Muhammad Beg Zulfiqar Khan, was a military commander in the 16th century in Mughal Empire. He served under the Mughal Emperors Humayun and Akbar. Beg was part of Humayun's forces when they retreated from India after the siege by Sher Shah. He remained with his leader throughout his exile in Persia.

It is reported that he was disliked by both the troops and generals and was eventually killed for cowardice by Bairam Khan.

Beg is said to have refused to give up his horse for the heavily pregnant Hamida, wife of Humayun, when she was eight months pregnant with her son Akbar. He is also said to have charged Humayun 20% interest on a loan.  Beg was further accused of deserting the city of Agra as soon as Hemu's forces approached.

The truth of these allegations is difficult to gauge as most were written after his death and following the great successes of Bairam Khan, his executor. The allegations therefore may have been created to justify the action taken by Bairam.

References
 Akbar-Nama Vol. 2 Chap. 9

Mughal generals